The Gentleman from Epsom (French: Le Gentleman d'Epsom) is a 1962 French–Italian comedy film directed by Gilles Grangier and starring Jean Gabin, Madeleine Robinson and Frank Villard.

The film was shot at the Saint-Maurice Studios in Paris. Racetracks scenes were shot at the Hippodrome d'Enghien-Soisy and Longchamp Racecourse on the outskirts of the city. The film's sets were designed by the art director Jacques Colombier.

Synopsis
Richard Briand-Charmery is an older gentleman who frequents the racetracks of Paris, selling tips to customers while always looking to make himself a profit out of the dealings. Circumstances generally conspire to prevent his fortune, and he is forced to rely on assistance of his family, partly by threatening to embarrass them by being sent to jail for failure to settle his losses. One day he encounters Maud, an old flame who he once come close to marrying before having to abandon her following a heavy loss at the Epsom Derby. Now married to a banker and living in New York, they relive the good old days, and he treats her to an extravagant dinner in a high-class restaurant that he can not pay for. He plans to dig himself out of his problems with a big scam, but soon finds himself even deeper in debt. Brief salvation comes when he is accidentally given the wrong ticket when laying a bet on horserace and wins a small fortune.

Cast 
 Jean Gabin as Richard Briand-Charmery, called "le Commandant"
 Louis de Funès as Gaspard Ripeux, the restaurateur of the Auvergne
 Jean Lefebvre as Charly le "tubeur"
 Paul Frankeur as Arthur, the boss of the circle of games
 Franck Villard as Lucien, the boss of the nightclub
 Madeleine Robinson as Maud, an old flame
 Joëlle Bernard as Ginette, wife of Lucien
 Josée Steiner as Béatrice, wife of Richard
 Marie-Hélène Dasté as the aunt Berthe
 Aline Bertrand as the patroness of the bar
 Camille Fournier as Thérèse, the sister of Richard
 Georgette Peyron as the player
 Jean Martinelli as Hubert, the husband of Theresa
 Paul Mercey as Oscar Robineau, the provincial
 Alexandre Rignault as Charlot
 Albert Dinan as Léon, the bonneteur
 Jacques Marin as Raoul, the butcher racegoer
 Léonce Corne as Mr. Freedman, a player
 Albert Michel as a player
 Marcel Bernier as a player
 Edouard Francomme as a player
 René Hell as a player
 Robert Blome as a player
 Léon Zitrone as commentator
 Raymond Oliver as in his own role on the television
 Paul Faivre as the recorder of tickets P.M.U

References

Bibliography
 Harriss, Joseph. Jean Gabin: The Actor Who Was France. McFarland, 2018.

External links 

 
 Le Gentleman d'Epsom (1962) at the Films de France
 Le gentleman d'epsom at the defunes.de

1962 films
French comedy films
French horse racing films
Italian comedy films
Italian horse racing films
1960s French-language films
French black-and-white films
Films directed by Gilles Grangier
Films with screenplays by Michel Audiard
Films with screenplays by Albert Simonin
Films shot at Saint-Maurice Studios
Films about gambling
Films shot in Paris
Films set in Paris
1960s French films
1960s Italian films
French-language Italian films